Caloptilia ribesella is a moth of the family Gracillariidae. It is known from Colorado and Washington in the United States.

The larvae feed on Ribes species, including Ribes bracteosum. They mine the leaves of their host plant.

References

ribesella
Moths of North America
Moths described in 1877